Won Tae-yeon (born 11 May 1990) is a Korean former footballer.

Career statistics

Club

Notes

References

1990 births
Living people
Sungkyunkwan University alumni
South Korean footballers
Association football forwards
China League One players
Gyeongnam FC players
Yanbian Funde F.C. players
Gangneung City FC players
South Korean expatriate footballers
South Korean expatriate sportspeople in China
Expatriate footballers in China